Amuru may refer to:

People
Amuru Mitsuhiro, a Russian sumo wrestler

Places
Amuru, Ethiopia, a town in Horo Gudru Welega Zone, Ethiopia
Amuru (woreda), a woreda in the Oromia Region of Ethiopia
Amuru District, a district in Northern Uganda
Amuru, Uganda, a town in Amuru District, Uganda